Groupe d'organisation nationale de la Guadeloupe (also known as GONG) was a political group that campaigned for Guadeloupe, an overseas region of France in the Caribbean, to have complete independence from France. Founded in Paris in 1963, by mostly male students, GONG would become one of the most significant anti-colonial groups in the territory and its diaspora.

References 

1963 establishments in Guadeloupe
Anti-imperialism
History of Guadeloupe
Organizations based in Paris
Organizations established in 1963
Organizations with year of disestablishment missing